Peaceful (lit. In His Lifetime) is a 2021 French drama film directed and co-written by Emmanuelle Bercot, starring Catherine Deneuve and Benoît Magimel.

The film had its premiere at the 2021 Cannes Film Festival. Portraying a man facing a serious illness and undeniable death, Benoît Magimel won the Award for Best Actor at the 27th Lumières Awards and 47th César Awards.

Premise
Benjamin, a theatre professor, whose life expectancy is estimated to be a year after diagnosed with Stage IV cancer.

Cast

Production
Principal photography began on 11 October 2019. The filming was suspended on 25 November after Catherine Deneuve suffered a stroke. Deneuve returned to the film set in July 2020.

Release
Peaceful had its world premiere at the 2021 Cannes Film Festival, screened out of competition. The film was released in France on 24 November 2021.

Reception

Accolades

References

External links
 

2021 films
2021 drama films
2020s French-language films
French drama films
Medical-themed films
Films directed by Emmanuelle Bercot
2020s French films